Rudolf Loewenstein can refer to:

Rudolf Löwenstein, German author
Rudolph Loewenstein (psychoanalyst)